is a Japanese professional footballer who plays for the South Korean team Ansan Greeners.

Club career
Go Iwase joined the J2 League club Kyoto Sanga FC in 2014. In 2016, he moved to FC Gifu.

Club statistics
As of the end of the 2018 season.

References

External links

 
	

1995 births
Living people
Association football people from Chiba Prefecture
Japanese footballers
Japanese expatriate footballers
Association football midfielders
J2 League players
J3 League players
Kyoto Sanga FC players
FC Gifu players
Thespakusatsu Gunma players
J.League U-22 Selection players
Ansan Greeners FC players
K League 2 players
Japanese expatriate sportspeople in South Korea
Expatriate footballers in South Korea